The corneal limbus (Latin: corneal border) is the border between the cornea and the sclera (the white of the eye). It contains limbal stem cells in its palisades of Vogt. It may be affected by cancer or aniridia (a developmental problem), among other issues. The limbal ring is a visible dark ring around the iris of the eye composed of darkened areas of the corneal limbus.

Structure 
The corneal limbus is the border between the cornea and the sclera. It is highly vascularised. Its stratified squamous epithelium is continuous with the epithelium covering the cornea.

The corneal limbus contains radially-oriented fibrovascular ridges known as the palisades of Vogt that contain limbal stem cells. The palisades of Vogt are more common in the superior and inferior quadrants around the eye.

Clinical significance

Cancer 
The corneal limbus is a common site for the occurrence of corneal epithelial neoplasm.

Aniridia 
Aniridia, a developmental anomaly of the iris, disrupts the normal barrier of the cornea to the conjunctival epithelial cells at the limbus.

Calcification 
The limbus sign shows dystrophic calcification of the limbus, appearing as an abnormal white color.

Glaucoma treatment 
The corneal limbus may be cut to allow for aqueous humour to drain from the anterior chamber of the eye into the subconjunctival space. This can be used in glaucoma treatment. The hole created only needs to be small, although slightly bigger than needed to account for gradual healing. This procedure sometimes fails, particularly if the hole is large. It can lead to eye irritation from blebbing.

Trabeculectomy, a surgery used to treat glaucoma, is best performed with an incision through the superior part of the corneal limbus. Mattress suturing may be used to close this incision.

History 
The word "limbus" comes from the Latin meaning "border".

References

External links 
  - "Sagittal Section Through the Eyeball"
 https://web.archive.org/web/20060510060508/http://www.vetmed.ucdavis.edu/courses/vet_eyes/images/s_4021_2.jpg

Human eye anatomy
Ophthalmology drugs